General Hutchison may refer to:

Alexander Richard Hamilton Hutchison (1871–1930), Royal Marines general
Balfour Hutchison (1889–1967), British Army lieutenant general
David William Hutchison (1908–1982), U.S. Air Force major general
Robert Hutchison, 1st Baron Hutchison of Montrose (1873–1950), British Army major general

See also
Grote Hutcheson (1862–1948), U.S Army major general
Charles Scrope Hutchinson (1826–1912), Royal Engineers major general (honorary rank)
William Nelson Hutchinson (1803–1895), British Army general